Moin-ul-Haq Stadium is located in Rajendra Nagar, Patna, Bihar, India. The multi-purpose stadium has hosted three One Day International (ODI) matches including one from the 1996 Cricket World Cup. The stadium has a capacity of 25,000 people. It is used for cricket and association football. It is the home ground of Bihar Ranji Team. The government has proposed the stadium development expanding its seating capacity to 42,500. It is maintained by Bihar Cricket Association. Bihar Ranji Team had currently played many Ranji matches on this ground.

History
The stadium was previously known as Rajendra Nagar Stadium. It was renamed in 1970 after the death of icon Moin-ul-Haq,  who was general secretary of Indian Olympic Association (IOA), India's chef-de-mission of the Indian Olympic contingent in 1948 to London and in 1952 to Helsinki, and one of the founding vice-presidents along with K A D Naoroji of the Bihar Cricket Association, in the year 1936 at Jamshedpur,  of Bihar.

In 2013, it was announced by the Chief Minister of Bihar Nitish Kumar that an international cricket stadium will be constructed at Rajgir, Nalanda district and Moin-ul-Haq Stadium and Patliputra Sports Complex's indoor stadium will go for renovations.

Ground information

It was a state-of-the-art stadium in India with modern seating, equipment and facilities for players and spectators alike. But as the stadium is being neglected by the Board of Control for Cricket in India when it comes to hosting of international match because of problem between the Bihar Cricket Association and the Board of Control for Cricket in India, it has become totally outdated (more after the Indian Premier league emerged and other stadiums became Up-To-Date). After Jharkhand was carved out of Bihar, Bihar lost its Ranji Trophy team status. So, no Ranji Trophy matches are even held here. The stadium features a swimming pool and a cricket academy. It has a "Turf" pitch that follows the international standard. It is very near to Rajendra Nagar Terminal.

List of Five Wicket Hauls

Key

One Day Internationals

Moin-ul-Haq Metro Station
In August 2022, Chief Minister Nitish Kumar inaugurated the underground metro rail work it at Moin-ul-Haq Stadium by unveiling the stone plaque of the underground work of Patna Metro Rail Project. The civil work on underground metro station at Moin-ul-Haq Stadium  started with the construction of the diaphragm wall (D-wall), the main support structure to demarcate the station premises. Around 82-foot-long D-wall, a concrete structure, was inserted in the dug-up ground with similar depth.

See also 
 Nalanda International Cricket Stadium
 Patliputra Sports Complex

References

External links
  Cricinfo Website - Ground Page

Football venues in Bihar
Sports venues in Patna
Cricket grounds in Bihar
1996 Cricket World Cup stadiums
1969 establishments in Bihar
Sports venues completed in 1969
20th-century architecture in India